This is a list of Italian television related events from 1990.

Events
21 March - Italy wins the 35th Eurovision Song Contest in Zagreb, SR Croatia, Yugoslavia. The winning song is "Insieme: 1992", performed by Toto Cutugno.

Debuts

Rai

Serials 

 Pronto soccorso (Emergency department) – medical drama, with Ferruccio and Claudio Amendola, directed by Francesco Massaro; 2 seasons.

Variety 
Stasera mi butto (Tonight I have a go) – talent show of impressionists (later extended to other categories), directed by Pier Francesco Pingitore ; 4 seasons (the first is hosted by Gigi Sabani, the most famous Italian impressionist of the time). The show reveals comic actors as Giorgio Panariello, Neri Marcorè and Max Giusti.

Fininvest

Variety 
Mai dire gol (Never say goal) – by Gialappa’s band; 11 seasons. The show reuses the footage of other sport programs, with the trio’s voiceover mocking pitilessly football players, coaches and journalists; later, it becomes a real variety, with the sketches of comic actors as Teo Teocoli and Aldo, Giovanni & Giacomo and the presence of showgirls as Elen Hidding and Simona Ventura.

International
25 September - / Alfred J. Kwak (Italia 1) (1989-1990)
/ Babar (Rai 2) (1989-1991)

Television shows

RAI

Drama 

 I ragazzi di via Panisperna (Via Panisperna boys) – by Gianni Amelio, with Andrea Prodan (Ettore Majorana), Ennio Fantstichini (Enrico Fermi) and Laura Morante; in 2 parts; distributed also in a theatrical version.

Miniseries 

 I promessi sposi (The betrothed) – parody of the Manzoni’s novel, with the trio Marchesini-Solenghi-Lopez (also directors); the three actors play all the characters, save some cameos by TV stars; in 5 episodes. The classic novel is the pretext for a crazy satire of any conceivable TV and film genre. The show gets more public and critic success than the serious version, broadcast few months before.
A violent life – by Giacomo Battiato, from the Benvenuto Cellini’s autobiography, with Wadeck Stanczak (Cellini), Max von Sydow (Pope Clemens VII) and Ben Kingsley; 3 episodes. Distributed also in a theatrical version.
A season of giants – by Jerry London, biopic about the youth of Michelangelo Buonarroti (played by Mark Frankel), with F. Murray Abraham (Pope Julius II) and Ornella Muti; 3 episodes.
La piovra 5 – Il cuore del problema (The hearth of the matter) – by Luigi Perelli, with Vittorio Mezzogiorno, Patricia Millardet and Remo Girone; 5 episodes. After the killing of the superintendent Cattani, a female judge and a retired policeman carry on his fight against the Sicilian mafia.

Serials 

 Il giudice istruttore (The examining magistrate) – by Florestano Vancini, with Erland Josephson, Vittorio Gassman and Luca Zingaretti; inspired by the life of Ferdinando Imposimato.

Variety 

 Il caso Sanremo (The Sanremo case) – history of the Sanremo festival in form of a parodic trial, with Renzo Arbore, Lino Banfi and several singers as guest stars.

News and educational 

 La mia guerra (My war) – by Paolo Cazzara, with Enza Sampò and Leo Benvenuti; reportage in 7 episodes about the Second World War in Italy as lived by the civilians, with several eyewitness accounts.

For children 
L’albero azzurro (The blue tree) – show of educative entertainment for the littlest ones, with the puppet-bird Dodò as protagonist, realized with the contribution of renowned authors and educationalists (Bianca Pitzorno, Bruno Munari, Nico Orengo); again on air.

Finivest

Serials 
Cri Cri – sequel of Arriva Cristina, with Cristina D’Avena; 2 seasons.

Ending this year

Births

Deaths

See also
List of Italian films of 1990

References